Dolgi Laz is a small settlement in the hills south of Most na Soči in the Municipality of Tolmin in the Littoral region of Slovenia.

References

External links 
Dolgi Laz on Geopedia

Populated places in the Municipality of Tolmin